Walton in Gordano railway station served the village of Walton in Gordano, North Somerset, England from 1907 to 1940 on the Weston, Clevedon and Portishead Railway.

History 
The station opened on 7 August 1907 by the Weston, Clevedon and Portishead Railway. A loop siding and a cattle pen were built nearby in 1926. The station closed on 20 May 1940.

References

External links 

Disused railway stations in Somerset
Railway stations opened in 1907
Railway stations closed in 1940
1907 establishments in England
1940 disestablishments in England
Railway stations in Great Britain opened in the 20th century